Lebedenco is a commune in Cahul District, Moldova. It is composed of three villages: Hutulu, Lebedenco and Ursoaia.

References

Communes of Cahul District